Euptilopareia is a genus of bristle flies in the family Tachinidae.

Species
Euptilopareia erucicola (Coquillett, 1897)
Euptilopareia vicinalis Reinhard, 1956

References

Dexiinae
Diptera of North America
Tachinidae genera
Taxa named by Charles Henry Tyler Townsend